Dimarella angusta is a species in the antlion family.

References

    

Myrmeleontidae
Insects described in 1908